The 2016 Copa América de Beach Soccer (known natively in Spanish as the Copa América de Futbol Playa) was the first edition of the Copa América de Beach Soccer,  the premier international beach soccer competition in South America, contested between the men's national teams of the members of CONMEBOL.

The competition was organised by CONMEBOL; other beach soccer exhibition events held under the Copa América title took place during 1994–99, 2003 and 2012–14, however this was the first edition to be officially organised by the governing body for South American football who also organise the other official Copa América events in association football and futsal.

The tournament was hosted by Brazil in the city of Santos between 13 and 18 December.

Brazil beat Paraguay 12–2 in the final to claim the inaugural crown.

Teams
Teams representing all 10 members of CONMEBOL took part.

Venue

One venue was used in the city of Santos, Brazil.
An arena built on the Praia do Gonzaga (Gonzaga beach) hosted all the matches.

Referees
Fourteen officials were appointed by CONMEBOL on 17 November, instructed to arrive in Santos by 11 December. 

 Mariano Romo 
 Jose Mendoza
 Ivo De Moraes
 Renato De Carlos 
 Carlos Rumiano 
 Juan Carlos Amaya
 Fabricio Quintero
 Jose Cortez 
 Jorge Luis Martinez
 Mike Palomino
 Alex Valdiviezo 
 Pablo Cadenasso 
 Carlos Aguirregaray 
 Jose Gregorio Misel

Draw
The draw to split the ten teams into two groups of five took place on 26 November in Luque, Paraguay at the Auditorio de la Confederación Sudamericana de Fútbol.

The teams were seeded based on their final ranking in the most recent previous CONMEBOL beach soccer tournament, the 2015 South American Beach Soccer Championship.

Initially, the top two seeds were automatically assigned to the groups:

to Group A: as the top seeds, 
to Group B: as the second seeds, 

The remaining eight teams were split into four pots of two based on their seeding, in order from the highest seeds placed in Pot 1, down to the lowest seeds placed in Pot 4. From each pot, one team was drawn into Group A and the other team was drawn into Group B.

Group stage
Each team earns three points for a win in regulation time, two points for a win in extra time, one point for a win in a penalty shoot-out, and no points for a defeat. The top team of each group, advance to the final. The teams finishing in second through fifth proceed to play in consolation matches against the teams finishing in the same position in the other group to determine their final rank.

All times are local, BRST (UTC–2).

Group A

Group B

Final stage

Ninth place play-off

Seventh place play-off

Fifth place play-off

Third place play-off

Final

Awards

Winners trophy

Individual awards

Final standings

Source

References

External links
Copa América de fútbol playa Brasil 2016, at CONMEBOL (in Spanish)
Copa America Fútbol Playa 2016, at Beach Soccer Worldwide (archived)
Copa América 2016, at Beach Soccer Russia (in Russian)

2016
Beach soccer in Brazil
2016
2016 in Brazilian football
2016 in beach soccer
December 2016 sports events in South America
2016 in South American football